Erik Kramár (born 12 July 2001) is a Slovak footballer who plays for Dubnica as a defender.

Career

FK Pohronie
Kramár joined Pohronie in the summer of 2020 as his first club in senior football, having previously played for youth categories of ViOn Zlaté Moravce, Nitra and lastly Zbrojovka Brno, where he made frequent appearances in the U19 squad. According to Kramár, Pohronie had shown interest back in the winter of 2020. He opted for Pohronie following the his return from the Czech Republic caused by the COVID-19 pandemic and a feasible opportunity to play at the Žiar nad Hronom-based club. He departed from the club in January 2021 without making a single appearance.

International career

U19 team
Manager of the Slovak U19 team Albert Rusnák had repeatedly nominated Kramár for preparatory camps and unofficial fixtures during the 2019/20 season. He was also listed as a replacement in the nomination for two official youth international friendly fixtures against Cyprus and Latvia.

References

External links
 Futbalnet profile

2001 births
Living people
People from Zlaté Moravce
Sportspeople from the Nitra Region
Slovak footballers
Slovak expatriate footballers
Association football defenders
FK Pohronie players
Kisvárda FC players
FK Dubnica players
Nemzeti Bajnokság III players
2. Liga (Slovakia) players
Expatriate footballers in Hungary
Slovak expatriate sportspeople in Hungary